This is a list of the resident commissioners of Swaziland, a kingdom in Southern Africa which gained full independence in 1968. 

After the Second Boer War ended in 1902, a Swaziland order in council was made in Britain in 1903 and a Swaziland administration was proclaimed in 1904, which set up the machinery of government under a resident commissioner. However, 
Labotsibeni, Regent of Swaziland, protested strongly against the terms of both. In 1905, Prince Malunge led a Swazi deputation to Pretoria to meet the British High Commissioner for Southern Africa, William Palmer, 2nd Earl of Selborne, and Selborne visited Swaziland in September 1906. He announced on his visit that the administration of Swaziland would, in view of the imminent restoration of self-government to the Transvaal, be transferred to himself. As a result of Labotsibeni's pressure, the threat posed by the recent Zulu uprising, and the unresolved issue of the land concessions, Swaziland thus became a high commission territory, under the High Commissioner for Southern Africa, like Bechuanaland and Basutoland, although it was never declared to be a British protectorate, a status the Regent would not accept.

Resident commissioners

See also
High Commissioner for Southern Africa

References

Government of Eswatini